Isla Zacate Grande is a stratovolcano in Honduras. The island has seven of the 13 Aldeas (known as towns or neighborhoods) son of the city Amapala. These are subdivided into hamlets.

References

Stratovolcanoes of Honduras
Zacate